Squalidus gracilis is a species of cyprinid fish found in Japan and the Korean peninsula.

References

Squalidus
Taxa named by Coenraad Jacob Temminck
Taxa named by Hermann Schlegel
Fish described in 1846